Wojciech Wojcik (born 31 May 1992) is a Polish professional footballer who plays as a forward for Chicago House AC in the National Independent Soccer Association.

Early life
Wojcik was born in Poland, but grew up in Chicago, training with the Chicago Fire Academy while in high school.

Career
In February 2015, Wojcik signed for North American Soccer League side Indy Eleven.

On 18 May 2016, Wojcik moved on a season-long loan to United Soccer League side Oklahoma City Energy. He joined the club permanently on 10 January 2017.

After a season with National Premier Soccer League side New York Cosmos B, Wojcik joined USL club Hartford Athletic ahead of their inaugural 2019 season. He led the club in goals with seven, including the game winning goal in three of the team's eight wins.

Wojcik signed with USL League One side Forward Madison on January 14, 2020.

On 1 June 2021, Wojcik became the third player to sign for National Independent Soccer Association side Chicago House AC ahead of the team's inaugural season.

Honors
Indy Eleven
NASL Spring championship: 2016

New York Cosmos B
NPSL North Atlantic Conference
Regular season championship: 2018
Playoff championship: 2018

References

External links
 Bradley profile
 

Living people
1992 births
Polish footballers
People from Dąbrowa Tarnowska
Association football forwards
Bradley Braves men's soccer players
FC Ilves players
Indy Eleven players
OKC Energy FC players
New York Cosmos B players
Hartford Athletic players
Ykkönen players
Kakkonen players
North American Soccer League players
USL Championship players
National Premier Soccer League players
National Independent Soccer Association players
Polish expatriate footballers
Expatriate footballers in Finland
Expatriate soccer players in the United States
Polish expatriate sportspeople in the United States
Forward Madison FC players
Soccer players from Chicago